M.C. Breed & DFC. is the collaborative studio album by American recording artist MC Breed and hip hop duo DFC from Flint, Michigan. It was released on August 13, 1991 through S.D.E.G. Records with distribution via Ichiban Records. Production was handled by MC Breed, Herman Lang, Pierre Ushay and S. Harris with executive producers Tim Brown and Leroy McMath. The album found some success on the Billboard charts, peaking at #142 on the Billboard 200, #38 on the Top R&B/Hip-Hop Albums and #3 on the Top Heatseekers.

The album spawned two charting singles, "Ain't No Future in Yo' Frontin'", which made it to #66 on the Billboard Hot 100 and #12 on the Hot Rap Singles, and "Just Kickin' It" which made it to #10 on the Hot Rap Singles.

Track listing

Sample credits
Job Corp
"Superman Lover" by Johnny "Guitar" Watson
That's Life
"Blind Man Can See It" by James Brown
Ain't No Future in Yo' Frontin'
"Funky Worm" by Ohio Players
"More Bounce to the Ounce" by Zapp
Better Terms
"The Grunt" by The J.B.'s
"Funky Drummer" by James Brown
Just Kickin' It
"If You Let Me" by Eddie Kendricks

Personnel
Eric Breed – performer, producer, mixing, assistant engineering
Alpha "Al" Breed – performer
Bobby T. "T-Dub" Thompson – performer
Herman Lang, Jr. – producer
Pierre Ushay – producer (track 4)
Schzelle Salomon Harris – producer (track 4)
Leroy McMath – executive producer, mixing, assistant engineering, management
Tim Brown – executive producer
Bernard Terry – mixing, engineering
Robert Dawkins – mixing, engineering
Yvonne Williams – coordinator
Nina K. Easton – art direction & design

Charts

Weekly charts

Year-end charts

References

External links

1991 debut albums
MC Breed albums
DFC (group) albums
Collaborative albums